Lesley Welch may refer to:

 Lesley Lehane (athlete)
 Leslie Welch (entertainer)